Luv Sinha (born 5 June 1983) is an Indian actor and politician who played the lead role in the Hindi film Sadiyaan (2010). He also starred in J. P. Dutta's Paltan (2018).
He is the son of Shatrughan Sinha and Poonam Sinha and the elder brother of actress Sonakshi Sinha.

Filmography
 Sadiyaan (2010)
 Paltan (2018)
 Gadar 2 (2023)

Political career
He contested in 2020 Bihar Legislative Assembly election from INC in  Bankipur Constituency against Nitin Nabin from BJP and lost by 39,036 votes.

References

External links

 

1983 births
Indian male film actors
Male actors in Hindi cinema
Male actors from Mumbai
Living people
Indian National Congress politicians from Bihar